The World War II Memorial, also known as World War II Memorial Plaza, is a granite war memorial by Conrad G. Walton, installed in Houston's Heights Boulevard Park, in the U.S. state of Texas.

See also
 List of public art in Houston
 World War I Monument

References

1999 establishments in Texas
1999 sculptures
Granite sculptures in Texas
Monuments and memorials in Texas
Outdoor sculptures in Houston
World War II memorials in the United States